The second season of xxxHolic, is an anime adaptation of a manga series written by Clamp. It was developed by Production I.G with the main staff and cast remaining the same as in the first season. The season aired on TBS on April 3, 2008 in Japan and ended on June 26, 2008, with 13 episodes in total.

The opening theme is "NOBODY KNOWS" by Shikao Suga and the ending theme is "Honey Honey" by Seamo.



Episode list

References

2008 Japanese television seasons
XxxHolic